David Camp may refer to:

 Dave Camp (born 1953),  U.S. Representative from Michigan
 David M. Camp (1788–1871), Vermont attorney and politician

See also
Camp David